Hunter Island and Matthew Island are two small and uninhabited high islands in the South Pacific, located  east of New Caledonia and south-east of Vanuatu archipelago.

Small, arid, without fresh water and not easily accessible, the islands had no interest for Britain or France during their colonisation of the Pacific in the course of the 18th and 19th centuries. France officially annexed both islands in 1929. In 1965, the United Kingdom also claimed the two islands, as part of the New Hebrides. France conducted a symbolic occupation in 1975. In 1980, on its independence, Vanuatu claimed sovereignty, but made no occupation of the islands. In 1979, Météo-France set up an automatic weather station on one of the islands, and the French Navy regularly visits both of them.

Hunter Island
Hunter Island is also known as Fern or Fearn Island. The first recorded sighting of the island was by Captain Thomas Fearn from his trading ship Hunter in 1798. It is composed of andesite – dactic lavas and numerous explosion craters dot the volcano. A cone makes up the south part of the island, with its central crater filled by a lava dome. A -deep crater is located on the north-west side of the island. Fumarolic and solfataric activity continues in the north of the island, as well as on the northeast and southeast coasts. Two small eruptions took place in the mid-1800s. In 1835, a lava flow erupted and on 15 March 1841, an explosive eruption took place. In 1895, lava was seen flowing from two craters on the east side of the island. A small (VEI 0) fissure eruption took place in 1903, on the northern side of the island, and produced lava.

Hunter Island is symbolically claimed by a micronation, the Federal Republic of Lostisland.

Seismicity
The islands are prone to earthquakes, as they are situated near the southern arc of the South New Hebrides Trench, where the minor New Hebrides Plate is subducted by the Indo-Australian Plate. In February 2021, a 7.7  quake was centered in the vicinity of Matthew and Hunter.

Important Bird Area
The island has been recognised as an Important Bird Area (IBA) by BirdLife International because it supports a breeding population of red-tailed tropicbirds, with some 100–200 pairs estimated in 2007.

Matthew Island

The volcanic island is composed of two andesitic-to-dactic volcanic cones, East Matthew and West Matthew, separated by a rocky 200-metre-wide isthmus. At the time of the discovery, only East Matthew existed and it was described as having only one peak prior to the Second World War.

East Matthew is the older part of the island, formed from basalt with a half-destroyed, 142-m-high composite volcanic cone that is thought to be composed of three lava flows. There is still some volcanic activity on the island with sulphuric fumaroles rising from craters in the south-east. West Matthew formed in the late 1940s and may have had eruptions as recent as 1976. It is a roughly circular, -high cone with a serrated peak and is composed almost entirely of lava flows and slag. It contains a crater that is breached to the northwest. A lava flow from West Matthew makes up the northwest coast of the island.

Eruptions
All known historical eruptions have come from West Matthew. After a highly seismically active period in the 1940s, construction of West Matthew began as submarine eruptions built up a new island. The new cone then emitted lava flows. The eruption was a VEI 2. Another VEI 2 eruption from West Matthew took place in October 1954, while a very small (VEI 0) fissure eruption occurred in approximately 1956. This marks the latest confirmed activity on Matthew Island, although tremors took place near the island in 2008, 2009 and 2011. Uncertainty surrounds a report of an eruption in 1828, as well as reports of eruptions in 1966 and 1976.

Important Bird Area
The island has been recognised as an Important Bird Area (IBA) by BirdLife International because it supports breeding populations of brown boobies and blue noddies.

See also

 Fiji–France Maritime Delimitation Agreement
 Desert island
 Lists of islands

References

Bibliography
 Dunmore, John: Who's who in Pacific navigation, Honolulu: Univ. of Hawaii Pr., 1991 
 Sharp, Andrew: The discovery of the Pacific Islands, Oxford 1960

External links
 Wolfgang Schippke: Île Metthew & Île Hunter (German), (English, but much shorter)

Disputed islands of Oceania
Disputed islands
Volcanoes of the Pacific Ocean
Territorial disputes of France
Borders of New Caledonia
Uninhabited islands of New Caledonia
Important Bird Areas of New Caledonia
Seabird colonies
Uninhabited islands of Vanuatu
Volcanoes of Vanuatu
Territorial disputes of Vanuatu